The Beibu Gulf Economic Rim or Beibu Economic Belt also known as Gulf of Tonkin Economic Belt in (Vietnamese: Vành đai kinh tế vịnh Bắc Bộ) defines the economic region or rim surrounding around China's southwestern coastal region and cities around the Gulf of Tonkin. The region is part of Chinese government's "Go West" strategy, to boost its less developed western regions. The implementation of the campaign, has resulted in many construction projects in cities on the Beibu Gulf Rim, especially in Guangxi. The Beibu Gulf economic rim has emerged as a new highlight of China-ASEAN cooperation, especially between Vietnam, who is also cooperating in this economic zone. It covers Guangdong, Hainan and Guangxi, and northern and central Vietnam.

Geography

China
 Guangxi region: Nanning, Beihai, Yulin, Qinzhou, Chongzuo, and Fangchenggang
 Guangdong province: Zhanjiang (Lianjiang and Leizhou)
 Hainan province: Haikou, Danzhou, Dongfang, and Sanya

Vietnam
 Municipalities: Hanoi and Haiphong
 Northeastern Vietnam and Red River Delta
 North Central Vietnam: Hà Tĩnh, Quảng Bình, Thanh Hóa, Nghệ An, and Quảng Trị.

The cooperation scope includes trade, investment, exploitation of marine, tourism and oceanic environmental protection.

See also
Sino-Vietnamese relations

References

External links
Official website of Beibu Gulf Economic Rim 环北部湾经济圈 

Economy of Vietnam
Economy of China